Tridesmostemon is a genus of the plant family Sapotaceae described as a genus in 1905.

Tridesmostemon is native to western and central Africa.

Species
 Tridesmostemon congoensis (A.Chev.) Aubrév. & Pellegr - Gabon
 Tridesmostemon omphalocarpoides Engl. - Nigeria, Cameroon, Gabon, Cabinda, Central African Rep., West Congo, East Congo

References

Chrysophylloideae
Sapotaceae genera